The Compendium of U.S. Copyright Office Practices is a manual produced by the United States Copyright Office, intended for use primarily by the Copyright Office staff as a general guide to policies and procedures such as registration, deposit and recordation. It does not cover every principle of copyright law or detail every aspect of the Office's administrative practices.

The Compendium is directed to policy under the 1976 Copyright Act, as amended. It is now in its third edition, replacing the earlier "Compendium II", which in turn replaced the original Compendium that described policy under the earlier 1909 Copyright Act.

The Compendium is an internal manual, and does not have the force of law, unlike the U.S. Copyright Act or Copyright Office regulations. However, some courts have cited to it as persuasive authority and given it deference based on the Copyright Office's specialized experience and broader investigations and information. For some issues that are not addressed in the statute or regulations (for example, whether to issue a registration to a government body claiming a copyright in its enacted laws), it can provide guidance as to the Copyright Office's practice.

The Compendium is sometimes, but not often, used by attorneys in dealings with the Copyright Office. A Westlaw search of the FIP-CS database which contains documents from the U.S. Supreme Court, Courts of Appeals, District Courts, Bankruptcy Courts, Court of Federal Claims, U.S. Tax Court, Military Courts, and related federal and territorial courts showed fewer than fifty citations of the Compendium by the courts total. This is in contrast to, for example, the Manual of Patent Examining Procedure, which is heavily relied upon by attorneys and agents dealing with the patent functions of the United States Patent and Trademark Office.

A public draft of the third edition of the Compendium was released by the Copyright Office on August 19, 2014. The official version, entitled Compendium of U.S. Copyright Office Practices, Third Edition, was released on December 22, 2014. Proposed revisions to the Compendium were published on June 1, 2017; After a comment period, a revised version of the Compendium was published on September 29.  It includes changes taking the Star Athletica, LLC v. Varsity Brands, Inc., 580 U.S. __ (2017), decision into account.

 the January 28, 2021 release is the most current.

See also 
 Manual of Patent Examining Procedure
 Trademark Manual of Examining Procedure

References

External links
Official copies of the Compendia, hosted by the U.S. Copyright Office
 Compendium of the U.S. Copyright Offices Practices, Third Edition (official version, January 28, 2021)
Compendium of U.S. Copyright Office Practices, Third Edition (official version, December 22, 2014)
 Compendium of Copyright Office Practices (Compendium II) (official version, 1984)(superseded)
 Compendium of Copyright Office Practices (Compendium I) (official version, as of July 1, 1973)(superseded)
Unofficial archives of the Compendia
 An online copy of the superseded Compendium II, at the IP Mall (operated by Franklin Pierce Law Center).
 Another copy of superseded Compendium II
 An online copy of the superseded Compendium I (July 1973), at the IP Mall.
 Copyright Office regulations

United States Copyright Office
Publications of the United States government
Copyright law literature